The Dunn Center is a venue for the performing arts at North Carolina Wesleyan University in Rocky Mount, North Carolina. It hosts the 1,180 seat Minges Auditorium, Powers Recital Hall, Mims & Gravely Art Galleries, Carlton Board Room, and Garner Lobby banquet hall. Minges Auditorium is one of the largest performing arts facility in eastern North Carolina. The stage has full technical facilities, including fly space and orchestra pit. It is the venue for the Wesleyan Season Series, home of the Tar River Orchestra and Chorus, and site of Wesleyan Theatre Department productions.

References

Performing arts centers in North Carolina